The culture of the Native Hawaiians encompasses the social behavior, institutions, and norms practiced by the original residents of the Hawaiian islands, including their knowledge, beliefs, arts, laws, customs, capabilities, and habits. Humans are estimated to have first inhabited the archipelago between 124 and 1120 AD when it was settled by Polynesians who voyaged to and settled there. Polynesia is made of multiple island groups that spread from Hawaii to New Zealand across the Pacific Ocean. These voyagers developed Hawaiian cuisine, Hawaiian art, and the Native Hawaiian religion.

Hula

Hula is the dance form originating in Hawaii. It derives from other Polynesian dance forms. It has two basic forms: Hula Auana and Hula Kahiko. Hula Auana reflects European/American influences and is performed with musical instruments that do not originate from the Hawaiian Islands. Hula Kahiko was developed prior contact with these other cultures. 

The annual Merrie Monarch Festival celebrates Hula and gathers Hula Halau from across the world. It was created to honor King David Kalākaua, who was the last reigning king of Hawaii. He was known for restoring and elevating Hula to the Hawaiian Islands after the United States missionaries arrived. The halau compete and share their knowledge of Hawaiian culture.

Voyaging
Polynesians traveled to Hawaii and throughout the Pacific region on voyaging canoes of their own design, navigating using only their senses, observing the skies, wind, water, and wildlife around them. 

The outrigger canoe was a common means of traveling around and between the islands. Outrigger canoe paddling spread from Hawaai to become an international sport, educating people from all over the world about Hawaiian culture.

The Polynesian Voyaging Society works to preserve the skills of boat construction and traveling via traditional methods. The double hulled Hōkūleʻa was built in the 1970s to reflect and preserve this knowledge. It has circumnavigated the earth, visiting communities and sharing knowledge since that time.

Cuisine

When Polynesians first migrated to the Hawaiian Islands, almost no edible plants were available. They brought many different plants such as taro, bananas and sweet potatoes. The most important food eaten was taro, which was used to make poi; which was a big part of their everyday diet.  Polynesians also brought pigs, chickens, and dogs and bred them on the islands. Some common Hawaiian dishes include: Kalua pig, Lau-lau, Poke, Squid Luau, and Haupia.

Religion

The traditional Hawaiian religion is a polytheistic animistic religion. Its beliefs encompass the presence of spirits in objects such as the waves and the sky. The Hawaiian religion believes in four gods; Kāne, Kanaloa, Kū, and Lono. Kāne is the God of creation, Kanaloa is the God of the ocean, Ku is the God of war and male pursuits, and Lono is the God of peace, rain, and fertility. They also believe in forty male gods (ka hā), four hundred gods and goddesses (ke kanahā), the spirits (na ‘unihipili), and the guardians (na ‘aumākua). Notably, Pele is the goddess of volcanos and fire.

The Hawaiian religion is protected under the American Indian Religious Freedom Act.

(ho-o-pono-pono) is a cultural practice of reconciliation and forgiveness, usually combined with prayer. Similar forgiveness practices were performed on islands throughout the South Pacific, including Samoa, Tahiti and New Zealand. It is used in spiritual, emotional, mental, and physical healing practices. Traditional Hawaiian philosophy does not consider the physical and non-physical aspects of the world to be separate, therefore, to heal one aspect, all must be healed. Conversely, healing one will help to heal the rest. For example, if a person has an upset stomach, healing anger toward a sibling may also help to heal the stomach. Modern versions of  may also contain elements of Christian belief and ritual.

Music 

Mele are the Hawaiian poems and songs. Ole are chants. Mele and ole are important parts of Hawaiian rituals. Portuguese, Mexicans, and Spanish brought musical instruments such as the ukulele and the guitar that Hawaiians adopted. As Hawaiian music evolved, music using these instruments found worldwide popularity, beginning in the 1920s. Hawaians invented slack-key guitar and steel guitar, techniques that spread around the world.

Western contact, colonization and immigration

First contact came either in 1778 with an expedition led by James Cook, although possibly as early as 1542 with an expediction led by Ruy López de Villalobos. Christian missionaries arrived in the early 1800s, and began coverting the Hawaiians to their faiths and influencing Hawaiian culture. In the 1830s, repeated interactions began between Hawaii and other cultures such as Mexican, Portuguese and Spanish. Hawaiian culture was progressively influenced by western cultures. incorporating useful items into each other's daily lives.

Many of the missionaries developed negative opinions about Hawaiian culture. After the 1893 overthrow of the Hawaiian Kingdom there were many attempts to extinguish Hawaiian language and culture during the early 20th century. Hula, Hawaiian, paddling, and music were all frowned upon. Hawaiian children were sent to missionary schools where they were taught in English and Hawaiian was ignored. English also became the language of business and government, although immigrants from Japan, Portugal, the Philippines, and other places brought their languages with them.

In 1898 the United States enacted the Newlands Resolution, annexing the Hawaian islands. In 1959, following a referendum  in which over 93% of Hawaiian residents voted in favor of statehood, Hawaii became the 50th state. At its height the Hawaiian population an estimated 683,000 Native Hawaiians lived in the islands. By 1900 the native population had dropped below 100,000. The Native Hawaiian population was reduced to 20% of the total due to disease, inter-marriage and migration. The diseases spread from outside Hawaii such as smallpox, cholera, influenza, and gonorrhea. Unlike Europeans, Hawaiians had no history with these diseases and their immune systems were unprepared to fight them.

Hawaiians today 

Hawaii continues to become more diverse as more people immigrate to the islands. At the same time, fewer pure-blooded Native Hawaiians remain, now largely driven by intermarriage. Many Native Hawaiians are homeless or impoverished. In 2016, studies conducted by the US Department of Housing and Urban Development reported that 42% of Hawaii's homeless population identified as either Native Hawaiian or Pacific Islander. 

In the 1970s, a local movement began to reinvigorate Hawaiian culture and restore it to a central role in Hawaii. Hula is widely practiced, immersion schools teach the Hawaiian language, Hawaiian foods and dishes are available, and cultural practioners pass traditions to succeeding generations and educate others about the rich history of the islands.

Tourism remains the center of the state's economy. On average about 220,000 tourists visit Hawaii per day according to studies conducted in 2016.

Bishop Museum
Hawaiian is a popular academic term used in reference to history and various aspects of the culture of Hawaii, currently a region and state of the United States. The term is used especially in reflection of the periods of antiquity and the Kingdom of Hawaii era. Hawaiian has become increasingly popular among students of history and sociology throughout the world. The principal repository of Hawaiian is the Princess Bernice Pauahi Bishop Museum in Honolulu on the island of Oahu. The institution is also called the Hawaii State Museum of Natural and Cultural History and shares artifacts and information with other institutions globally for research and study.

The term "Hawaiian" was coined in 1948 by Hawaiian entertainer and cultural expert, Nona Beamer.

Commercialization

Erica Lee and Melissa Gan, writing for The Sheaf, discussed the appropriation of Hawaiian culture by non-Hawaiian students and the stigma that comes from the criticism of appropriation. They criticized the oversimplification of the culture. 

In 1919 David and Lydia Bray and a group of young girls gathered before a court of Hawaiians who had power behind their names. They danced a  hula. The judges deemed the presentation as nothing more than a cultural dance. 

In the 1930s Hawaiian women came to the American continent and danced a westernized version of Hula that became popular and created an “imagined intimacy" between Americans and Hawaiians. Americans celebrated Hawaiian culture, while Hawaiians were upset about Hawaii's annexation by the United States and rejected these dances as not true Hula.

America portrayed Hawaiian culture falsely in venues such as Hollywood movies, music, and marketing. Corporations adopted elements of Hawiian culture in their marketing and products. For example, they used traditional Luau to celebrate events such as weddings, birthdays, and graduations. Luaus changed from a traditional practice to a purchased event letting others experience a slice of Hawaiian culture. Traditional Luaus didn't include alcohol, buffets, or performances or happen every day.

See also
Hawaiian art
Hawaiian language
Lei
Music of Hawaii
Native Hawaiians
First Hawaiian Renaissance
Second Hawaiian Renaissance
Ray Jerome Baker (1880–1972), an American photographer noteworthy as a pioneering photographer, and in particular for his studies portraying the people of Hawaii

References